Alan Kaye may refer to:

Alan S. Kaye (1944–2007), American linguist
Alan Kaye (engineer) (fl. 1963), British engineer who described the Kaye effect
Alan Kaye, FIFA international referee; see 2003 Football League play-offs
Alan Kaye (fl. 1980s–1990s), American disk jockey with WGTZ in Dayton, Ohio

See also
Alan Kay (disambiguation)